There is a large population of Lebanese people in Côte d'Ivoire, whose numbers are variously estimated in the tens or hundreds of thousands. They are the largest Lebanese diaspora community in West Africa. An estimated 1% of all people living in the Ivory Coast are from Lebanon. 90% of the Lebanese community in Ivory Coast lives in Abidjan, where they represent over 7% of the total population.

Migration history
There have been two major waves of migration from Lebanon to Côte d'Ivoire; the two groups, the durables (established families) and the nouveaux (newcomers), form separate communities. Though Lebanese migration to other countries of West Africa began as early as the 1890s, the colonial economy in Côte d'Ivoire did not develop until after World War I, and as such, no Lebanese community formed there until the 1920s. The journey took several weeks; migrants went by donkey from their home villages in southern Lebanon to Beirut, and from there took a ship to Marseille, where they would have to wait for one of the infrequent departures to West Africa. Some may have originally intended to head for the United States, but either found upon arrival in Marseille that they could not afford the fare and thus opted for a cheaper journey to West Africa, or were tricked into boarding ships for the wrong destination. Other early migrants did not come straight from Lebanon, but were instead drawn from among the children of earlier Lebanese migrants to Senegal. The community grew quickly due to the relative lack of entry formalities compared to other West African countries.

Beginning in the mid-1970s, a new wave of Lebanese émigrés began to arrive, fleeing the Lebanese Civil War. Their presence sparked government fears that they might bring with them the sectarian violence that had infected their homeland; however, no such violence actually erupted. By the late 1980s, reportedly 60,000 to 120,000 Lebanese and Syrians lived in Côte d'Ivoire, although some observers gave a figure as high as 300,000. Many of these later migrants came from the town of Zrarieh in southern Lebanon. With recent advances in transport and communications, a form of transnationalism has emerged among the community; people are constantly going back and forth between Lebanon and Côte d'Ivoire, and greeting and farewell parties for new arrivals and departures have become "significant ritualised events".

Trade and employment
The Lebanese began at the lowest level of commerce, trading in inexpensive commodities, but during the Great Depression, expanded their scale of enterprise and began to displace independent European merchants. The petits blancs, in response, began a campaign to restrict Lebanese (and also Syrian) immigration, but government efforts in this regard were mostly ineffective. The Lebanese also invested heavily in urban real estate and were among the first to develop hotels and restaurants in previously less accessible areas of the interior. More recently, they have also become involved in football scouting, establishing training schools for youths and helping them to establish contact with European clubs. Groups from different villages in Lebanon dominate different trades; for example, those from Zrarieh are involved in the plastics business, while those from Qana work with textiles.

Lebanese Ivorians claim that they control about 40% of the economy of the Ivory Coast.

Gender issues
The Lebanese community is largely endogamous. Young men hoping to get married either look for a Lebanese woman locally, or take a holiday back to their ancestral villages in Lebanon and marry a woman there before bringing her back to Côte d'Ivoire.  However, this has not always been the case. In the early 20th century, it was common for young Lebanese male migrants to be so poor that they could not afford such a trip back, or even to pay the fare to Côte d'Ivoire for a bride their relatives had arranged; as such, they married African women instead. Women's fashion has diverged sharply from the former agricultural norm in southern Lebanon, with competing "modern Muslim" and "westernised" styles, both consisting of clothes which seek to distinguish themselves from the so-called "peasant look" indicating that the wearer engages in manual labour.

Interethnic relations
The Lebanese diaspora in Côte d'Ivoire is divided into two distinct communities: the people who have been in the country for two or more generations and the people who have only arrived in the country in the past two decades. Both groups find themselves vulnerable to political pressure and manipulation because of their inability to assimilate into Ivoirian society.

The first President of Côte d'Ivoire, Félix Houphouët-Boigny, was a defender of the Lebanese minority during his early time in office.

The Lebanese were particularly targeted by looters during the 2010–11 Ivorian crisis, after Lebanon’s ambassador to Ivory Coast, Ali Ajami, attended Laurent Gbagbo's presidential swearing-in ceremony (one of only two diplomats to do so), despite widespread support for his rival, Alassane Ouattara. Many Lebanese were also seen by Ivorians as being pro-Gbagbo.

See also
 Arab diaspora
 Lebanese diaspora
 Lebanese people in South Africa
 Lebanese people in Senegal
 Lebanese people in Sierra Leone

Footnotes

Bibliography

Further reading

 
Côte d'Ivoire
Ivory Coast